Harold Dwight Lasswell (February 13, 1902December 18, 1978) was an American political scientist and communications theorist. He earned his bachelor's degree in philosophy and economics and was a PhD student at the University of Chicago. He was a professor of law at Yale University. He studied at the Universities of London, Geneva, Paris, and Berlin in the 1920s . He served as president of the American Political Science Association (APSA), of the American Society of International Law and of the World Academy of Art and Science (WAAS).

He has been described as a "one-man university" whose "competence in, and contributions to, anthropology, communications, economics, law, philosophy, psychology, psychiatry and sociology are enough to make him a political scientist in the model of classical Greece."

According to a biographical memorial written by Gabriel Almond at the time of Lasswell's death and published by the National Academies of Sciences in 1987, Lasswell "ranked among the half dozen creative innovators in the social sciences in the twentieth century." At the time, Almond asserted that "few would question that he was the most original and productive political scientist of his time."

Areas of research in which Lasswell worked included the importance of personality, social structure, and culture in the explanation of political phenomena. Lasswell was associated with the disciplines of communication, political science, psychology, and sociology – however he did not adhere to the distinction between these boundaries but erased the lines drawn to divide these disciplines.

Work
Lasswell is well known for his model of communication, which focuses on "Who (says) What (to) Whom (in) What Channel (with) What Effect".

He is also known for his book on aberrant psychological attributes of leaders in politics and business, Psychopathology and Politics, as well as for another book on politics, Politics: Who Gets What, When, and How.

Lasswell studied at the University of Chicago in the 1920s, and was highly influenced by the pragmatism taught there, especially as propounded by John Dewey and George Herbert Mead. However, more influential on him was Freudian philosophy, which informed much of his analysis of propaganda and communication in general. During World War II, Lasswell held the position of Chief of the Experimental Division for the Study of War Time Communications at the Library of Congress. He analyzed Nazi propaganda films to identify mechanisms of persuasion used to secure the acquiescence and support of the German populace for Hitler and his wartime atrocities. Always forward-looking, late in his life, Lasswell experimented with questions concerning astropolitics, the political consequences of colonization of other planets, and the "machinehood of humanity".

Lasswell introduced the concept of a "garrison state" in a highly influential and often cited 1941 article originally published in the American Journal of Sociology. It was a "developmental construct" that outlined the possibility of a political-military elite composed of "specialists in violence" in a modern state.

In his presidential address to the American Political Science Association, he raised the famous question, demanded by the expulsion of essences from the sciences, of whether or not we should give human rights to robots.

Lasswell's work was important in the post-World War II development of behavioralism. Similarly, his definition of propaganda was viewed as an important development to understanding the goal of propaganda. Lasswell's studies on propaganda produced breakthroughs on the subject which broadened current views on the means and stated objectives that could be achieved through propaganda to include not only the change of opinions but also change in actions. He inspired the definition given by the Institute for Propaganda Analysis: "Propaganda is the expression of opinions or actions carried out deliberately by individuals or groups with a view to influence the opinions or actions of other individuals or groups for predetermined ends through psychological manipulations." This went well with his views on democracy and individual freedom: "This regard for men in the mass rests upon no democratic dogmatism about men being the best judges of their own interests. The modern propagandist, like the modern psychologist, recognizes that men are often poor judges of their own interests."

Lasswell utilized Sigmund Freud's methodology. Upon studying in Vienna and Berlin with Theodor Reik, a devotee of Freud, Lasswell was able to appropriate Freud's methods. Lasswell built a laboratory in his social science office. It was here that he conducted experiments on volunteers, students, at the University of Chicago  Using this instrument, he was able to measure the participants’ emotional state to their spoken words. Lasswell was furthermore able to use psychoanalytical interviewing and recording methods that he appropriated from his time of studying with Elton Mayo at Harvard University.

Lasswell was a “behavioral revolution” proponent. Lasswell was credited with being the founder of the field of political psychology and was the man at which the concepts of psychology and political science intersected. By utilizing psychoanalytic biographies of political leaders, he expanded the base from which potential evidence could be garnered. The benefit of this contribution is that he was able to engage in another method of research – content analysis. By being able to use preexisting data, he was in a position to show that his work was not purely positivist but also stepped into the realm of interpretivist as well – helping him to come together in studies of personality and culture in tandem with his political behavior research.

Content analysis is the “investigation of communication messages by categorizing message content into classifications in order to measure certain variables” 
While the data existed to Lasswell in the form of analyzing the messages that Allied and Axis armies disseminated within warfare, it may not have been the most accurate of methodologies for analyzing the data. “Content analysts usually seek to infer the effects of the messages that they have analyzed, although actual data about such communication effects are seldom available to the content analyst”   While Lasswell was able to perform this particular type of analysis, the weakness to this was that Lasswell could not verify his data due to communication effects not actually being available. This is because content analysis cannot study effects.  While this was a weakness, he did develop content analysis as a communication tool that is still utilized today.

Lasswell also had an impact upon Political Science under the topic of Policy but more specifically Public Policy and policy cycles. Defining public policies as government decisions with an emphasis on the bond between policy goals and policy means used to compose policies. Alongside the link between expectations of policies and the methods to achieve them for governments, Lasswell can be also noted for his contribution to policy cycle with his seven-stage cycle  to ensure societies' problems are handled by the implementation of public policy.  However, some argue that Lasswell never meant the seven-stages to be understood as a policy cycle or a linear process

Leo Rosten included an appreciation of him in "People I have loved, known or admired".

Contributions

Lasswell made these contributions to the field of communication study:
His five-questions model of communication led to the emphasis in communication study on determining effects. Lasswell's contemporary, Paul Lazarsfeld, did even more to crystallize this focus on communication effects.
He pioneered in content analysis methods, virtually inventing the methodology of qualitative and quantitative measurement of communication messages (propaganda messages and newspaper editorials, for example).
His study of political and wartime propaganda represented an important early type of communication study. The word propaganda later gained a negative connotation and is not used much today, although there is even more political propaganda. Propaganda analysis has been absorbed into the general body of communication research.
He introduced Freudian psychoanalytic theory to the social sciences in America. Lasswell integrated Freudian theory with political analysis, as in his psychoanalytic study of political leaders. He applied Freud's id-ego-superego via content analysis to political science problems. In essence, he utilized intraindividual Freudian theory at the societal level.
He helped create the policy sciences, an interdisciplinary movement to integrate social science knowledge with public action. The social sciences, however, generally resisted this attempt at integration and application to public policy problem.

Selected bibliography
Articles
"The Garrison State." American Journal of Sociology , Vol. 46, No. 4, January 1941, pp. 455–468.
"Does the Garrison State Threaten Civil Rights?" Annals of the American Academy of Political and Social Science, Vol. 275, Civil Rights in America, May 1951, pp. 111–116.
"The Promise of the World Order Modelling Movement." World Politics, Vol. 29, No. 3, April 1977, pp. 425–437.

Books
Propaganda and Promotional Activities: An Annotated Bibliography (1935)
Politics: Who Gets What, When, How (1936)
World Revolutionary Propaganda: A Chicago Study (1939)
World Politics Faces Economics (1945)
Propaganda, Communication, and Public Opinion: A Comprehensive Reference Guide (1946)
The Analysis of Political Behaviour: An Empirical Approach (1948)
The Structure and Function of Communication in Society (1948)
National Security and Individual Freedom (1950)
Power and Society: A Framework for Political Inquiry (1950)
Language of Politics (1949)
Propaganda Technique in the World War (1927; Reprinted with a new introduction, 1971)
Psychopathology and Politics (1930; Reprinted, 1986)
World Politics and Personal Insecurity (1935; Reprinted with a new introduction, 1965)
Politics: Who Gets What, When, How (1936)
Power and Personality (1948)
Political Writings: Representative Selections (1951)
The Future of Political Science (1963)
World Revolutionary Elites: Studies in Coercive Ideological Movements (1965)
Political Communication: Public Language of Political Elites in India and the US (1969)
A Pre-view of Policy Sciences (1971)
Peasants, Power, and Applied Social Change: Vicos as a Model (1971)
The Search for World Order: Studies by Students and Colleagues of Quincy Wright (1971)
Values and Development: Praising Asian Experience (1976)

See also
 William Ascher
 Charles O. Jones
 John W. Kingdon
 Myres McDougall
 Herbert A. Simon
 Overton window

Further reading
Articles
Marvick, Dwaine. "The Work of Harold D. Lasswell: His Approach, Concerns, and Influence." Political Behavior, Vol. 2, No. 3, 1980, pp. 219–229.
Eulau, Heinz, and Susan Zlomke."Harold D. Lasswell’s Legacy to Mainstream Political Science: A Neglected Agenda." Annual Review of Political Science, Vol. 2, 1999, pp. 75–89.

Bibliography
Muth, Rodney, and Marcia F. Muth. Harold D. Lasswell: An Annotated Bibliography. Springer Science & Business Media, 1990.  / .

References

External links
 Harold Dwight Lasswell papers at Yale University Library
Gabriel L. Almond, "Harold Dwight Lasswell", Biographical Memoirs of the National Academy of Sciences (1987) 

1902 births
1978 deaths
American political scientists
Communication theorists
Analysands of Theodor Reik
University of Chicago alumni
Social Science Research Council
Members of the United States National Academy of Sciences
Presidents of the American Society of International Law
20th-century political scientists